Quentin George Murray Smythe  (6 August 1916 – 22 October 1997) was a South African recipient of the Victoria Cross, the highest and most prestigious award for gallantry in the face of the enemy that can be awarded to British and Commonwealth forces.

Early life

Smythe was born on 6 August 1916, the grandson of the penultimate Prime Minister of Natal, Charles Smythe and was educated at Weston Agricultural College and Estcourt High School.

Military career

During the Second World War, he served with the 1st Battalion Royal Natal Carabineers 1st SA Infantry Division, South African Forces in the East Africa Campaign against the Italians before moving to the Western Desert.

Victoria Cross

He was 25 years old, and a sergeant when the South African Forces were attacked near Alem Hamza in Libya. During the attack, Smythe realised that there was no officer to command his platoon and took charge himself. Although he had a wound in his forehead, causing much loss of blood, he managed single-handedly to obliterate a machine gun post, taking all the surviving crew prisoner. Then, again single-handedly and armed only with rifle and bayonet, he promptly did the same with an enemy anti-tank gun crew, after which he consolidated the position. However, because of the deterioration of the situation elsewhere, he found himself ordered to withdraw.

He was awarded the Victoria Cross for his bravery, the citation was gazetted on 11 September 1942:

{{blockquote|War Office, 11th September, 1942

The KING has been graciously pleased to approve the award of the VICTORIA CROSS to:
No. 4458 Sergeant Quentin George Murray Smythe, South African Forces.
 
For conspicuous gallantry in action in the Alem Hamza area on the 5th June, 1942.

During the attack on an enemy strong point in which his officer was severely wounded; Sergeant Smythe took command of the platoon although suffering from a shrapnel wound in the forehead. The strong point having been overrun, our troops came under enfilade fire from an enemy machine-gun nest. Realising the threat to his position, Sergeant Smythe himself stalked and destroyed the nest with hand grenades, capturing, the crew. Though weak from loss
of blood, he continued to lead the advance, and on encountering an anti-tank gun position again attacked it single-handed and captured the crew. He was directly responsible for killing several of the enemy, shooting some and bayonetting another as they withdrew.

After consolidation he received orders for a withdrawal, which he successfully executed, defeating skilfully an enemy attempt at encirclement.

Throughout the engagement Sergeant Smythe displayed remarkable disregard for danger, and his leadership and courage were an inspiration to his men.}}

Later life

He married Dale Griffiths, in 1945 (dissolved 1970); they had three sons and one daughter. He married Margaret Joan Shatwell in 1970; she died in 1980. He married his third wife, Patricia Stamper, in 1984.

He later achieved the rank of captain and after the war served with the South African Ministry of Defence. On leaving the Department of Defence, he returned to farming in the Richmond area of Natal.  He was an outstanding marksman, a passionate conservationist and animal lover.

He died from cancer in Parklands Hospital Durban, South Africa in October 1997.

The medal
Auctioned in UK 1998, the medal is now part of the Lord Ashcroft Collection at the Imperial War Museum in London.

Notes

References

Monuments to Courage (David Harvey, 1999)
The Register of the Victoria Cross (This England, 1997)

External links
Sergeant Q.G.M. Smythe in The Art of War exhibition at the UK National Archives
News Item (obituary)
A List of South African-born Recipients of the Victoria Cross 1855-1945 by Ross Dix-Peek

1916 births
1997 deaths
People from uMngeni Local Municipality
White South African people
South African people of British descent
South African Army officers
South African military personnel of World War II
South African recipients of the Victoria Cross
South African World War II recipients of the Victoria Cross
South Africa–United Kingdom relations
Deaths from cancer in South Africa